Matthew Bernstein (born October 16, 1998) is a make-up artist and internet celebrity known for creating infographics and photographing makeup looks that comment on social and political issues affecting the LGBTQ+ community.

Biography 
Bernstein was born on October 16, 1998, in New Jersey. He grew up in a suburb of New Jersey with a traditional Jewish family. He attended Westfield High School (New Jersey) and New York University Tisch School of the Arts. Bernstein identifies as gay, something he realized at the age of ten. He didn’t come out until age fifteen due to fears relating to his family’s opinions and religion. However, Bernstein’s parents were ultimately accepting, and he has expressed that he has a good relationship with them. 

Bernstein began experimenting with makeup soon after coming out, first only using Wite-Out to paint his nails before eventually exploring eye shadow and eye liner. Prompted by the 2016 United States presidential election of Donald Trump, Bernstein began to photograph himself wearing makeup that highlighted issues affecting the LGBTQ+ community. He posted these photos on Instagram under the handle @mattxiv, a platform he had used since 2012 to originally promote freelance photography. (6) Bernstein has since amassed over a million followers on the platform, where he continues to post makeup looks and political infographics relating to LGBTQ+ issues.

Accomplishments 
 Matt Bernstein is most widely known for his pictures of his body art and makeup looks that he posts on Instagram. Featured on his face, arms, or chest, Bernstein’s art often includes bright and rainbow colors combined with bold lettered text that highlights LGBTQ+ issues. Bernstein also creates collage style infographics discussing current events and issues relating to the LGBTQ+ community that he posts on his Instagram.

 In August 2020, Bernstein began a YouTube channel. On his channel, Bernstein discussed his coming out journey, and also posted several reaction videos.

 In 2022, Bernstein won PinkNews’ Influencer of the Year award. The award was presented by Jessica Alves, and his acceptance speech addressed issues faced by the LGBTQ+ community.

References

External links 
 

 
 
 

1998 births
Living people
Wikipedia Student Program
American make-up artists
American Internet celebrities
LGBT people from New Jersey